Sant'Andrea a Montecchio is a village in Tuscany, central Italy, in the comune of Siena, province of Siena. At the time of the 2001 census its population was 726.

Sant'Andrea a Montecchio is about 7 km from Siena.

References 

Frazioni of Siena